This is a partial list of Hujjatul Islams, a title given to mid ranked Twelver Usuli Shi'a Muslim clerics.

The next higher clerical rank is Ayatollah, followed by Grand Ayatollah. This list contains only the names of those who have attained the rank Hojjatol Eslam/ Hojjatol Eslam wa Muslimeen. To see the list of Ayatollahs or Grand Ayatollahs, see the following articles: List of Ayatollahs; List of current Maraji; List of deceased Maraji.

Hierarchy of titles for Shia Muslim clerics:

 Grand Ayatollah (Marja')
 Ayatollah
 Hujjatol Islam

Current 
This is a list of Hujjatul Islams who are alive. The list is arranged in descending order of age, (oldest to youngest).

Deceased 
This is a list of Hujjatul Islams that have died. The list is arranged in descending order of their date of passing.

See also 

 List of Ayatollahs
 List of current Maraji
 List of deceased Maraji
 List of provincial representatives appointed by Supreme Leader of Iran
 List of Tehran's Friday Prayer Imams

References 

Shia clerics
Shia Islam
 
Lists of Islamic religious leaders
Ayatollahs
Hawza